David Feldberg (born 1977) is an American professional disc golfer, and tournament director. At the end of the 2017 season, he was the 45th ranked disc golfer in the world. Feldberg is one of the most successful disc golfers in the sport's history, having won 6 unique majors, second all time.

Professional career

2004 season
In many ways, Feldberg's 2004 season was a break-out year. It was in this year that he won his first National Tour event, besting second place by four shots in the Kansas City Wide Open. Also, he finished strong for the first time at World's, finishing fifth. Sprinkled through the year were top five finishes in other National Tour events.

2005 season
The 2005 season was once again a season of growth. Over the course of the year, Feldberg's Player Rating increased 13 points to a career high of 1028. He won his first career major this year, the United States Disc Golf Championship, becoming the first person not named Ken Climo or Barry Schultz to win this event. In addition to winning the USDGC, Feldberg won two NTs, and finished the year with close to $30,000 in earnings.

2008 season
2008 was a hallmark season for Feldberg. Playing in just 28 tournaments, he finished the year with 12 wins, including a National Tour victory. In addition to these victories, Feldberg also won two majors. In June he won the Japan Open, taking home over $6,000. Then in August he won the World Championships. After all was said and done, he finished the year with his best ever earnings and at the time his highest year end rating.

2011 season
During the 2011 season, Feldberg broke Ken Climo's rating record. During the March update, his rating jumped to 1046, besting Climo's by two.

Professional wins

Major wins (7)

Major playoff record (0-1)

National Tour wins (18)

NT playoff record (3-1)

Summary

Annual statistics

*At Year End

Equipment
Feldberg is sponsored by Infinite Discs since 2019. He throws a mixed bag with signature discs from a variety of different disc golf manufacturers.

References

External links
Dave Feldberg Website

American disc golfers
Living people
1977 births
Sportspeople from Portland, Oregon